TET is a Ukrainian-language national entertainment TV channel broadcasting in Ukraine. It is part of the large 1+1 Media Group, and broadcasts to more than 100 cities in Ukraine, with a technical penetration of  92.4%. The target audience of the channel is 8–40 years old.

History 
The TV channel appeared on air in Kyiv on January 24, 1992, under the name “Tet-a-tet” and became the first alternative to the “solid” state television. In 2001, it received a regional status, and in 2003 became nationwide. Since 2009, TET has been the part of 1+1 Media Group.

On August 21, 1995, the National Council of Ukraine on Television and Radio Broadcasting gave TV channel TET and TRK Kyiv the same broadcast frequency. The situation decided on August 18, 2003, then TET received a licence for 42 minutes, and TRK Kyiv remained on the 30th channel. Thus, both channels since they are able to conduct round-the-clock speech.

In 2001, the TV channel received the status of a regional, and in 2003 - nationwide.

On April 24, 2004, TET has changed logo and graphic broadcasting. Since then, reality shows, talk show, television series, humorous programs, cartoons, sports broadcasts are presented. There are no political programs, news on the TV channel. The channel cover covers 92.4% of the territory of Ukraine.

Since 2009, TET is part of the media conglomerate "1 + 1 media".

In November 2010, the General Producer of the TV channel was Iryna Kostyuk.

On February 14, 2011, TET spent rebranding.

Since February 21, 2014, on March 31, 2016, the post of TET General Producer hired Natalia Vashko. From April 2016, the General Producer of the channel is Victoria Shulzhenko.

From December 1, 2016 speaks 16:9.

On August 12, 2019, the TV channel conducted a rebranding in order to change the target audience. The slogan of the TV channel became an expression: "Tap - and you smile".

On September 16, 2019, Victoria Shulzhenko (Levchenko), which from 2016 was the Gen Proder Tel Channel Left a position and headed a business unit "1 + 1 Production".

From October 11 to the duties of the General Producer TET, which is now part of the business unit "TV Business" group 1 + 1 media, Oksana Petrishin is assigned, which in the group "1 + 1 media" from 2017 was headed by the «Paramount Comedy».

On March 2, 2020, the channel began broadcasting in High Definition Standard (HD).

Ratings 
In 2016, the average figure per day by target audience amounted to 7.4% - this is a record annual share in the history of the existence of a TV channel.

In 2020, the channel share amounted to 3.22% of the audience 18-54 (8th among Ukrainian TV channels) (according to Nielsen ratings, the auditorium 18-54, the city 50 thousand +)

Programming

In-house produced shows 
 Goddess of Shopping
 BarDuck
 Queen of the Ball
 Masha and Models
 Durniev+1
 TET's Dad/TET's Mom
 Sketch comedy “Nasty Girls”

Imported shows 
 True Blood
 Game of Thrones
 Walking Dead

Origin content and Critics 

According to the results of monitoring made by "Boycott Russian Films" campaign activists during the period from 8th to 14 September 2014 there was demonstrated 4 h 45 min of Russian content per day.

The activists of "boycott" were published data, according to which according to the monitoring data on September 27, 2014 on the TV channel, the share of Russian-speaking content was about 33%.

Logo 
The TV channel has changed 13 logos. The current one is 14th behind a medicine.

From 1992 to 1997 - was in the lower right corner. From 1997 to 1999 and since 2002 to 2003 - in the left upper corner. From 1999 to 2000 the logo was in the lower right corner. From 2001 to 2002 the logo was located in the lower left corner. From 2000 to 2001 and from 2003 to the present time stands in the upper right corner.

 From January 24, 1992 to January 23, 1997, the logo was a blue rectangle with the word "TET A-TET" white font. Was in the lower right corner. In 1993, the logo was black.
 From January 24, 1997 to 23 March 1999, the logo was the word "tete" with a blue thin font. Was in the left upper corner.
 From March 24, 1999 to November 30, 2000, the logo was the defeat of the word "TET" of green. Was in the lower right corner.
 From December 1, 2000 to May 31, 2001, the logo was a square in which a circle was introduced, which was divided into two parts vertically. Parts were not the same, Left was 30%, right - by 70%. In the left small part of the left, the word thin font "TET" was inscribed, which was posted vertically, in the right large part was placed by a large bold figure 4 and the logo was translucent. Was in the upper right corner.
 From June 1, 2001 to 9 October 2002, the logo was the word "TET" with a white thick font. Was in the lower left corner.
 From October 10, 2002 to 13 February 2003, the logo was similar to the second logo, but the word "TET" has a tricolor animation (blue-green yellow) in bold. Was there. From October 13, 2002 to 13 February 2003, the logo moved to the left upper corner.
 From February 14, 2003 to April 23, 2004, the logo was similar to the second and fifth logos, but the word "TET" was written in dark blue font. Was in the left upper corner. From April 12, 2003 to April 23, 2004, the logo moved to the right upper corner.
 From April 24, 2004 to August 31, 2010, the logo reminded the table, to the left of the letter "T" of red and pink color, to the right of the letter "T" of dark red color, on top of the letter "e" of a white color, under it there was a signature "TET" Dark - red and logo was translucent. Was in the upper right corner. In the winter and New Year's time since 2004 to 2010 on the letter "E" there was snow.
 From September 1, 2010 to February 13, 2011, the logo was the word "tete" with white bold, the symmetry lines were pink, the letter "e" was returned in a manuscript form and the logo was translucent. Was there.
 From February 14, 2011 to February 28, 2013, the logo consists of three volumetric layers of yellow, purple and blue. On the yellow layer, the letter "T", on the purple layer of the letter "E", on the blue layer of the letter "T".
 From March 1, 2013 to 25 June 2014 there was the same logo, but it became animated.
 On June 26, 2014 to January 18, 2015, the logo was a yellow color of three layers, and letters of Lilov color "T", "E", "T".
 From January 19, 2015 to 17 February 2020, the logo was a translucent gray in the form of three circles, each of them are translucent letters "T", "E" and "T".
 Since 18 February 2020, the same logo is used, but it became larger and gained a yellowish shade.

See also
 1+1
 2+2

References 

Television stations in Ukraine
Television channels and stations established in 1992
Ukrainian brands
1+1 Media Group
Ukrainian-language television stations in Ukraine
1992 establishments in Ukraine